Goh Choon Phong is the chief executive officer (CEO) of Singapore Airlines and Singapore Airlines Cargo. He was formally appointed to be the CEO on 1 January 2011 in an announcement dated 3 September 2010. Prior to his appointment, he worked for the SIA group for more than 20 years for the airlines' operations in China and Scandinavia.

References

 

1963 births
Living people
Massachusetts Institute of Technology alumni
Singapore Airlines people
Singaporean chief executives
Businesspeople in aviation
Chief executives in the airline industry